Muccan or Muccan Station is a pastoral lease and cattle station that once operated as a sheep station, located approximately  north east of Marble Bar and  south east of Port Hedland in the Pilbara region of Western Australia. Kookenyia Creek and the De Grey River run through the property. The country is gently undulating with large areas of spinifex.

The lease was initially taken up by Messrs. Grant, Anderson and Edgar, who appointed Christopher Coppin as manager to pioneer the property in 1879. After seven years at Muccan Coppin left and took up the neighbouring lease and founded Yarrie Station.

Some time later the Darlot brothers acquired the  property, which they exchanged with Ball and Corbett for the Warrawagine country that the pair held.
 
By 1897 the property was owned by the Ball brothers and Michael Corbett with at least 5,000 sheep being run at the station. The partnership was dissolved in 1900, leaving Corbett and one of the Ball brothers in charge. By 1906 approximately 17,000 sheep were shorn at Muccan. followed by 13,005 in 1908.

In 1912 Corbett was the sole proprietor at Muccan. Later the same year 19,000 sheep were shorn producing 330 bales of wool.

In 1914 about 18,000 sheep produced 300 bales.

Corbett died in 1923, and Holthouse became the sole owner of Muccan. Holthouse died in 1945 leaving the property to his wife and family.

Muccan has been run in conjunction with Yarrie Station since about 1990 by the Coppin family.

See also
List of ranches and stations

References

Pastoral leases in Western Australia
Pilbara
Stations (Australian agriculture)